Claude Ernest Dolman (May 23, 1906 – December 15, 1994) was an English-born Canadian academic and microbiologist.

Born in Porthleven, Cornwall, Dolman received his medical education from St Mary's Hospital Medical School in London. His teachers included Alexander Fleming and Almroth Wright. Fleming encouraged Dolman to conduct research into the Staphylococcus bacteria. In 1931, he moved to Canada and became a Research Assistant and Clinical Associate in Connaught Laboratories at the University of Toronto. In 1925, he moved to Vancouver. From 1936 to 1951, he was the head of the Department of Bacteriology and Preventive Medicine at the University of British Columbia and from 1951 to 1961 he was the head of the Department of Bacteriology and Immunology. He was also acting head of the Department of Nursing and Health from 1933 to 1943 and was head of the Department from 1943 to 1951.

In 1947, he was made a Fellow of the Royal Society of Canada and later served as its president for a term from 1969 to 1970.

References

1906 births
1994 deaths
Alumni of Imperial College London
Canadian microbiologists
British emigrants to Canada
Canadian people of Cornish descent
Fellows of the Royal Society of Canada
People from Porthleven
Academic staff of the University of British Columbia
University of Toronto people